In enzymology, a D-alanine gamma-glutamyltransferase is an enzyme that catalyzes the chemical reaction

L-glutamine + D-alanine  NH3 + gamma-L-glutamyl-D-alanine

Thus, the two substrates of this enzyme are L-glutamine and D-alanine, whereas its two products are NH3 and gamma-L-glutamyl-D-alanine.

This enzyme belongs to the family of transferases, specifically the aminoacyltransferases.  The systematic name of this enzyme class is L-glutamine:D-alanine gamma-glutamyltransferase.

References

 

EC 2.3.2
Enzymes of unknown structure